Sara Rasmussen (born 1990) is an American politician from Alaska. A Republican, she is a member of the Alaska House of Representatives, representing District 22.

Early life and career
Rasmussen has a real estate background. She also served on the Sand Lake Community Council.

Political career
Rasmussen defeated incumbent Jason Grenn in the 2018 election.

References

1990 births
21st-century American politicians
21st-century American women politicians
Date of birth missing (living people)
Living people
Republican Party members of the Alaska House of Representatives
People from Anchorage, Alaska
Women state legislators in Alaska